Kalateh-ye Pain Darreh (also Romanized as Kalāteh-ye Pā’īn Darreh; also known as Kalāteh-ye Pā’īn Deh) is a village in Barrud Rural District, Kuhsorkh County, Razavi Khorasan Province, Iran. At the 2006 census, its population was 281, in 85 families.

References 

Populated places in Kuhsorkh County